Jiang Guoliang is a retired male badminton player from China.

Career
He won the bronze medal at the 1983 IBF World Championships in mixed doubles with Lin Ying.

External links 
 Profile

Badminton players from Zhejiang
Living people
Asian Games medalists in badminton
20th-century births
Badminton players at the 1986 Asian Games
Chinese male badminton players
Asian Games silver medalists for China
Asian Games bronze medalists for China
Medalists at the 1986 Asian Games
Year of birth missing (living people)